Events in the year 1948 in Indonesia. The country had an estimated population of   72,979,300.

Incumbents
 President: Sukarno
 Vice President: Mohammad Hatta
 Prime Minister: Amir Sjarifuddin (until 29 January), Mohammad Hatta (from 29 January)
 Chief Justice: Kusumah Atmaja

Events
 Continuing Indonesian National Revolution
 17 January - Ratification of the Renville Agreement
 23 January - End of the Second Amir Sjarifuddin Cabinet
 2 February - First Hatta Cabinet takes office
 28 February - Adoption of United Nations Security Council Resolution 40 and United Nations Security Council Resolution 41 at the United Nations Security Council
 29 July - Adoption of United Nations Security Council Resolution 55 
 16 August - Founding of Bali Post Media Group media conglomerate
 Madiun Affair
 31 October - Establishment of the Protestant Church in West Indonesia
 19–20 December - Operation Kraai
 24 December - Adoption of United Nations Security Council Resolution 63 
 28 December - Adoption of United Nations Security Council Resolution 64 and United Nations Security Council Resolution 65
 Founding of Lippo Bank

Births
 March 8 - Sinta Nuriyah, 4th First Lady of Indonesia, wife of Abdurrahman Wahid  
 April 10 - Fauzi Bowo, politician, diplomat and former governor of Jakarta
 December 3 - Abdul Hamid, actor and puppeteer (died 2022)

Sports
 Founding of Assyabaab Surabaya football club

References

 
1940s in Indonesia
Years of the 20th century in Indonesia